Protodrilidae is a family of polychaetes belonging to the order Protodrilida.

Genera:
 Astomus Jouin, 1979
 Claudrilus Martínez, Di Domenico, Rouse & Worsaae, 2015
 Lindrilus Martínez, Di Domenico, Rouse & Worsaae, 2015
 Megadrilus Martınez, Di Domenico, Rouse & Worsaae, 2015
 Meiodrilus Martínez, Di Domenico, Rouse & Worsaae, 2015
 Parentodrilus Jouin, 1992
 Protannelis Lam, 1922
 Protodrilus Czerniavsky, 1881
 Protodrilus Hatschek, 1881

References

Polychaetes